Greatest Hits is a double-CD compilation of Thin Lizzy songs released in 2004.

Track listing
All tracks written by Phil Lynott unless stated.

Disc 1
"The Boys Are Back in Town" from Jailbreak
"Jailbreak" from Jailbreak
"Don't Believe a Word" from Johnny the Fox
"Dancing in the Moonlight (It's Caught Me in Its Spotlight)" from Bad Reputation
"Rosalie" [Live] (Bob Seger) from Live and Dangerous
"Waiting for an Alibi" from Black Rose: A Rock Legend
"Do Anything You Want To" from Black Rose: A Rock Legend 
"Sarah" (Lynott, Gary Moore) from Black Rose: A Rock Legend
"Chinatown" (Brian Downey, Scott Gorham, Lynott, Snowy White) from Chinatown
"Killer on the Loose" from Chinatown
"Trouble Boys" (Billy Bremner) Non-album single
"Hollywood (Down on Your Luck)" [Live] (Gorham, Lynott) from Renegade
"Cold Sweat" (Lynott, John Sykes) from Thunder and Lightning
"Thunder and Lightning" (Downey, Lynott) from Thunder and Lightning
"The Sun Goes Down" (Lynott, Darren Wharton) from Thunder and Lightning
"Dedication" from Dedication: The Very Best of Thin Lizzy
"Still in Love with You" from Nightlife
"She Knows" (Gorham, Lynott) from Nightlife
"Yellow Pearl" (Lynott, Midge Ure) from Solo in Soho*

Disc 2
"Whiskey in the Jar" (Trad., arr. Eric Bell, Downey, Lynott) Non-album single
"Out in the Fields" (Moore) from Run for Cover†
"Parisienne Walkways" (Lynott, Moore) from Back on the Streets‡
"Emerald" [Live] (Downey, Gorham, Lynott, Brian Robertson) from Live and Dangerous
"Bad Reputation" (Downey, Gorham, Lynott) from Bad Reputation
"Wild One" from Fighting
"Fighting My Way Back" from Fighting
"Showdown" from Nightlife
"Black Rose" (Lynott, Moore) from Black Rose: A Rock Legend
"Dear Miss Lonely Hearts" (Jimmy Bain, Lynott) from Solo in Soho*
"The Rocker" (Bell, Downey, Lynott) from Vagabonds of the Western World
"Are You Ready" [Live] (Downey, Gorham, Lynott, Robertson) from Life
"Renegade" (Lynott, White) from Renegade
"King's Call" from Solo in Soho*
"Angel of Death" (Lynott, Wharton) from Renegade
"Cowboy Song" [Live At The Sydney Opera House 1979] (Lynott, Downey) Previously unreleased
"The Boys Are Back in Town" [Live At The Sydney Opera House 1979] Previously unreleased

DVD
"The Boys Are Back In Town"
"Don’t Believe A Word" (Live)
"Dancing In The Moonlight" (Live)
"Rosalie" (Live)
"Waiting For An Alibi"
"Do Anything You Want To"
"Sarah"
"Chinatown"
"Killer On The Loose"
"Thunder And Lightning" (Live)
"Bad Reputation" (Live)
"King’s Call" by Phil Lynott
"The Rocker"
"With Love"
"Dear Miss Lonely Hearts" by Phil Lynott
"That Woman" (Live)
"Johnny The Fox"
"Wild One"
"Whiskey In The Jar" (TOTP 1.2.73)

All tracks by Thin Lizzy except:
* Phil Lynott
† Gary Moore and Phil Lynott
‡ Gary Moore

Personnel
Phil Lynott – bass guitar, vocals
Brian Downey – drums, percussion
Eric Bell – guitar on disc 2: tracks 1 & 11
Scott Gorham – guitar on disc 1: tracks 1–7, 9–18; disc 2: tracks 4–10, 12, 13, 15–17
Brian Robertson – guitar on disc 1: tracks 1–3, 5, 17 & 18; disc 2: tracks 4, 6–8, 12, 16 & 17
Gary Moore – guitar on disc 1: tracks 6–8; disc 2: tracks 2, 3 & 9; vocals on disc 2: track 2
Snowy White – guitar on disc 1: tracks 9–12; disc 2: tracks 10, 13 & 15
John Sykes – guitar on disc 1: tracks 13–15
Mark Knopfler – guitar on disc 2: track 14
Darren Wharton – keyboards on disc 1: tracks 9–15; disc 2: tracks 13 & 15
Midge Ure – keyboards on disc 1: track 19
Mark Nauseef – drums on disc 2: tracks 16 & 17

Charts and certifications

Weekly charts

Certifications

References

2004 greatest hits albums
Thin Lizzy compilation albums